Hirak may refer to:
 King Hirak, a figure in Hirak Rajar Deshe
 2019–2021 Algerian protests
 Hirak Rif, protest movement in Morocco
 Al-Hirak, Syria, town and sub-prefecture in Syria
 Popular Movement in Iraq
 Al-Hirak, Arabic name for the political movement Southern Movement in Yemen